The Bristow Producers were a minor league baseball team based in Bristow, Oklahoma. In 1923 and 1924, the Producers hosted home games at the Bristow Base Ball Park and played exclusively as members of the Class D level Oklahoma State League, winning the 1923 Oklahoma State League pennant and championship.

History
In 1923, Bristow, Oklahoma first hosted minor league baseball and won the league championship. Bristow became members of the reformed eight–team Class D level Oklahoma State League as the league expanded from six teams to eight. The Bristow Producers began Oklahoma State League play on May 20, 1923. The Clinton Bulldogs, Cushing Refiners, Drumright Boosters, Duncan Oilers, El Reno Railroaders, Guthrie, Oklahoma and Shawnee Indians joined the Producers in league play.

The Bristow Producers ended the 1923 Oklahoma State League season with a record of 66–56 to place 3rd in the overall standings under managers James Payne and Ralph Heatley. As the league played a split–season schedule, Duncan won the first–half standings and Bristow won the second–half standings. In the playoff, the Bristow Producers swept the Duncan Oilers in 4 games to win the Oklahoma State League championship. The final overall regular season standings were led by Duncan Oilers (71–53), Clinton Bulldogs (63–60), Cushing Refiners (67–53), Guthrie (57–64), El Reno Railroaders (56–63), Shawnee Indians (54–60) and Drumright Boosters/Ponca City Poncans (46–71).

In their final season, the Bristow Producers placed 2nd overall in the 1924 Oklahoma State League, as the league folded during the season. Although Bristow remained solid, other 1924 league franchises were unstable after the league began play on April 24, 1924. Guthrie moved to McAlester on May 24, 1924, the Ardmore Bearcats moved to become the Pawhuska Huskies on June 8, 1924, on the same day MCalister moved to Wewoka-Holdenville, before the team eventually settled in Enid on July 6, 1924.

The Oklahoma State League permanently folded on July 8, 1924. Ardmore won the first half standings and Cushing was leading the second half standings when the league folded. Overall, the Bristow Producers finished with the second best overall record in the league, with a record of 48–21. Bristow was managed again by Ralph Heatley. When the Oklahoma State League folded on July 8, 1924, Ardmore/Pawhuska had the best overall record (52–21), with Bristow 2.0 games behind. Bristow was followed by the  Cushing Refiners (49–27), Shawnee Indians (40–37), Duncan Oilers (33–37), Ponca City Poncans (32–44), Blackwell Gassers (20–53) and Guthrie/McAlester/Wewoka-Holdenville/Enid (18–48).

Bristow, Oklahoma has not hosted another minor league team.

The ballpark
The Bristow Producers were noted to have played home games at the Bristow Base Ball Park. The ballpark site later became known as "Klingensmith Park," a 320–acre park and the park is still in use as a public park with baseball fields and other amenities. The amphitheater within the park is on the National Register of Historic Places. Klingensmith Park is located at West 7th & Country Club Drive, Bristow, Oklahoma.

Year–by–year records

Notable alumni
The Bristow Producers full player rosters are not referenced.

References

External links
 Baseball Reference

Defunct minor league baseball teams
Defunct baseball teams in Oklahoma
Baseball teams established in 1923
Baseball teams disestablished in 1924
Creek County, Oklahoma